Akkord Industry Construction Investment Corporation OJSC is an Azerbaijani company that does construction work and produces construction materials. The company builds infrastructure projects in Georgia, Ukraine, Kazakhstan, Uzbekistan, and Turkey.

According to the company website, Akkord has completed $1.7 billion worth of construction projects. Current (as of July 2013) projects total $1.9 billion.

Facilities
Akkord owns and operates 40 plants within Azerbaijan. Akkord also has offices in Albania, Georgia, Germany, Kazakhstan, Russia, Turkey, Ukraine and Uzbekistan.

Gazakh Cement Plant
The International Bank of Azerbaijan (IBA) financed the construction of a cement plant located in the Gazakh region of Azerbaijan. Construction of the plant was completed in 2013. The plant is the second cement plant in Azerbaijan.

Key people
Vugar Suleymanov

Products and Services

Construction
Akkord builds:
 Bridges
 Public facilities
 Real estate
 Concrete and Asphalt pavement Roads
 Tunnels & Intersections

Production and Distribution
Akkord manufactures and distributes construction materials:
 Textile
 Paint
 Asphalt
 Bricks
 Concrete
 Fabricated metal products
 Gravel-sand
 Precast concrete
 Marble & Granite
 Cement

Markets

Azerbaijan

International
Akkord has contracts with construction and production companies from around the world, “among which are noteworthy” (according to Trend News Agency) are:
 Bouygues (France)
 Condotte (Italy)
 Freyssinet (France)
 Herrenknecht (Germany)
 Salini Impregilo (Italy)
 China National Materials Group Corporation (China)
 Unger Stahlbau (Germany)

References

2005 establishments in Azerbaijan